5G NR (New Radio) is a new radio access technology (RAT) developed by 3GPP for the 5G (fifth generation) mobile network. It was designed to be the global standard for the air interface of 5G networks. As with 4G (LTE), it is based on OFDM.

The 3GPP specification 38 series provides the technical details behind 5G NR, the successor of LTE.

The study of NR within 3GPP started in 2015, and the first specification was made available by the end of 2017.  While the 3GPP standardization process was ongoing, the industry had already begun efforts to implement infrastructure compliant with the draft standard, with the first large-scale commercial launch of 5G NR having occurred in the end of 2018.  Since 2019, many operators have deployed 5G NR networks and handset manufacturers have developed 5G NR enabled handsets.

Frequency bands 

5G NR uses frequency bands in two broad frequency ranges:
 Frequency Range 1 (FR1), for bands within 410 MHz – 7125 MHz
 Frequency Range 2 (FR2), for bands within 24250 MHz – 71000 MHz

Network deployments 

Ooredoo was the first carrier to launch a commercial 5G NR network, in May 2018 in Qatar.  Other carriers around the world have been following suit.

Development 
In 2018, 3GPP published Release 15, which includes what is described as "Phase 1" standardization for 5G NR. The timeline for Release 16, which will be "5G phase 2", follows a freeze date of March 2020 and a completion date of June 2020, Release 17 was originally scheduled for delivery in September 2021. but, because of the COVID-19 pandemic, it was rescheduled for June 2022.

Release 18 work has started in 3GPP. Rel.18 is referred to as "NR Advanced" signifying another milestone in wireless communication systems. NR Advanced will include features such as eXtended Reality (XR), AI/ML studies, and Mobility enhancements. Mobility is in the core of 3GPP technology and has so far been handled on Layer 3 (RRC), now, in Rel-18 the work on mobility is to introduce lower layer triggered mobility.

Deployment modes
Initial 5G NR launches will depend on existing 4G LTE infrastructure in non-standalone (NSA) mode, before maturation of the standalone (SA) mode with the 5G core network.  Additionally, the spectrum can be dynamically shared between 4G LTE and 5G NR.

Dynamic spectrum sharing 
To make better use of existing assets, carriers may opt to dynamically share it between 4G LTE and 5G NR.  The spectrum is multiplexed over time between both generations of mobile networks, while still using the 4G LTE network for control functions, depending on user demand.  Dynamic spectrum sharing (DSS) may be deployed on existing 4G LTE equipment as long as it is compatible with 5G NR.  Only the 5G NR terminal needs to be compatible with DSS.

Non-standalone mode
The non-standalone (NSA) mode of 5G NR refers to an option of 5G NR deployment that depends on the control plane of an existing 4G LTE network for control functions, while 5G NR is exclusively focused on the user plane. This is reported to speed up 5G adoption, however some operators and vendors have criticized prioritizing the introduction of 5G NR NSA on the grounds that it could hinder the implementation of the standalone mode of the network.

Standalone mode
The standalone (SA) mode of 5G NR refers to using 5G cells for both signalling and information transfer. It includes the new 5G Packet Core architecture instead of relying on the 4G Evolved Packet Core, to allow the deployment of 5G without the LTE network. It is expected to have lower cost, better efficiency, and to assist development of new use cases. However, initial deployment might see slower speed than existing network due to the allocation of spectrum.

Numerology (sub-carrier spacing) 

5G NR supports seven subcarrier spacings:

The length of CP is inversely proportional to the subcarrier spacing. It is 4.7 μs with 15 kHz, and 4.7 / 16 = 0.29 μs for 240 kHz subcarrier spacing.

See also 
 IMT-2020 – the International Telecommunication Union standards
 Network service
 Network virtualization

References

Mobile telecommunications
3GPP standards
5G (telecommunication)
Internet of things
Computer-related introductions in 2018
Wireless networking standards